Independence Rock is a large granite rock, approximately  high,   long, and   wide, which is in southwestern Natrona County, Wyoming along Wyoming Highway 220. During the middle of the 19th century, it formed a prominent and well-known landmark on the Oregon, Mormon, and California emigrant trails. Many of these emigrants carved their names on it, and it was described by early missionary and explorer Father Pierre-Jean De Smet in 1840 as the Register of the Desert. The site was designated a National Historic Landmark on January 20, 1961 and is now part of Independence Rock State Historic Site, owned and operated by the state of Wyoming.

Description
The rock is a large rounded monolith of Archean granite typical of the surrounding region and is an isolated peak at the southeast end of the Granite Mountains. Its appearance is somewhat like the rounded Enchanted Rock of Texas or Uluru in Australia (formerly known as Ayers Rock), although smaller in size. It is located in the high plateau region of central Wyoming, north of the Sentinel Rocks ridge and adjacent to the Sweetwater River.

History
The rock derives its name from the fact that it lies directly along the route of the Emigrant Trail. Pioneering wagon parties bound for Oregon or California usually left the Missouri River in the early spring and hoped to reach the rock by July 4 (Independence Day in the United States), in order to reach their destinations before the first mountain snowfalls. It was likely named prior to 1830. John C. Frémont camped a mile below this site on August 1, 1843 and made this entry in the journal of his 1843–1844 expedition:

Everywhere within six or eight feet of the ground, where the surface is sufficiently smooth, and in some places sixty or eighty feet above, the rock is inscribed with the names of travelers.  Many a name famous in the history of this country, and some well known to science, are to be found among those of traders and travelers.

Fremont carved a large cross into the rock monolith, which was blasted off the rock on July 4, 1847 by hundreds of California and Oregon emigrants who had gathered on the site.  Some Protestants considered the cross to be a symbol of the Pope and Catholicism. John Frémont was actually a member of the United States Episcopal Church.

On July 4, 1862, Independence Rock was the site of Wyoming's first Masonic Lodge meeting.

Gallery

References

External links

 
 
 

Rock formations of Wyoming
Inscribed rocks
Landforms of Natrona County, Wyoming
California Trail
Mormon Trail
Oregon Trail
Natural features on the National Register of Historic Places in Wyoming
National Historic Landmarks in Wyoming
Protected areas of Natrona County, Wyoming
Wyoming state historic sites
National Register of Historic Places in Natrona County, Wyoming
Road transportation on the National Register of Historic Places
IUCN Category III